is a third class airport located in the town of Shirahama, Wakayama, Japan. It serves the southern part of the Kii Peninsula with three daily Japan Airlines round-trips to Tokyo International Airport, utilizing Boeing 737-800 aircraft. The travel time is 65 minutes to Haneda and 75 minutes in reverse direction.

History
Nanki–Shirahama Airport is located in a hilly area about 1.5 kilometers southeast of the center of Shirahama Town, and was established by the Wakayama Prefectural government. It is the only airport in Wakayama prefecture and the southernmost airport in Honshu.The airport opened in April 1968 with a 1200 meter runway. Flights connecting Tokyo, Osaka (Itami) and Nagoya were opened, but subsequently the Osaka and Nagoya flights withdrew. An 1800 meter runway on the eastern adjacent land was completed on March 9, 1996 with the aim of upgrading the capability of the airport to handle jet aircraft. This runway was later was extended to 2000 meters.

The airport is located about 65 kilometers south-southeast of the city of Wakayama, which is the administrative and economic center of the prefecture. However, Kansai International Airport, which opened in 1994 is located closer, which had resulted in Nanki-Shirahama Airport being used mostly by tourists visiting Nanki-Shirahama Onsen and locations further south.

Airlines and destinations

Ground Transportation
The Michinori HD which operates the airport had thought that tried developing the airport into the hub of not only airline traffic but also other commerce. At present, the airport has turned the hub of various buses which come from Tokyo and Osaka, Kyoto.

References

External links

Nanki–Shirahama Airport in Japanese

Airports in Japan
Transport in Wakayama Prefecture
Buildings and structures in Wakayama Prefecture
Shirahama, Wakayama
Airports established in 1968
1968 establishments in Japan